Walter Coulston (31 January 1912 – June 1990) was an English footballer who played as an outside right for South Kirkby, Manchester City, Barnlsey and Notts County.

Playing career
Coulston began his football career with South Kirkby before joining Brentford in 1936 where he went on to make 12 appearances for the club, scoring one goal. In July 1937 he left Manchester City for Exeter City. and in June 1938 he returned north to Barnsley. In March 1939 Bradford City sent their manager, David Steele, to assess Coulson but in May 1939 he joined Notts County.

References

External links
Walter Coulston player profile

Date of death missing
English footballers
Association football defenders
South Kirkby Colliery F.C. players
Manchester City F.C. players
Barnsley F.C. players
Exeter City F.C. players
Notts County F.C. players
1912 births